Hari Ram is a Hindu politician from Sindh, Pakistan. A five-time legilslator to the Provincial Assembly of Sindh, Ram was the first non-Muslim to win a non-reserved constituency in (West) Pakistan; he served in the Senate from 2012 to 2018.

Early life
Ram was born on 29 May 1952 in Mirpurkhas. A landlord, he did not study beyond high school.

Political career
Ram won four consecutive elections to the Provincial Assembly of Sindh in 1988, 1990, 1993, and 1997 as one of the five representatives of the local Hindu community; he did not have any political affiliation. In 2012, he was elected to the Senate of Pakistan from the Pakistan Peoples Party (PPP) on the sole seat reserved for minorities from Sindh. 

In 2018, he was elected to the Provincial Assembly from Mirpur Khas-I, becoming the first non-Muslim to win a non-reserved constituency in any provincial assembly of (West) Pakistan. He was inducted into Chief Minister Syed Murad Ali Shah's cabinet, and made the Minister for Minorities Affairs with the additional portfolios of Social Welfare, and Prison.

Personal Life 
Ram has a son. On 21 May 2021, he suffered a cardiac arrest while attending a ministerial meeting.

Notes

References

Living people
Pakistani senators (14th Parliament)
Pakistan People's Party MPAs (Sindh)
Sindh MPAs 2018–2023
1952 births
Pakistani Hindus